The 2002 United States Senate election in Virginia was held on November 5, 2002. Incumbent Republican U.S. Senator John Warner won re-election to a fifth term, making him one of only three Virginia U.S. Senators to serve five or more terms. The Democrats did not field a candidate against Warner, and he won every single county and city in the state with at least 60% of the vote. , this was the last time the Republicans won a U.S. Senate election in Virginia.

Major candidates

Independents 
 Jacob Hornberger, libertarian political activist
 Nancy Spannaus, Lyndon LaRouche Movement activist

Republican 
 John Warner, incumbent U.S. Senator

General election

Predictions

Results

See also 
 2002 United States Senate elections

References 

2002 Virginia elections
Virginia
2002